Jerinin grad (meaning "Jerina [Irene]'s town") is a Serbian folk name for several fortresses, fortifications and ruins in Serbia and Montenegro.

Fortifications
Bovan or Bolvan, fortress ruins on the Sokobanjska Moravica
Bris or Gradac, fortress near Prijepolje
Dragoševac, fortified town near Jagodina
Grabovac, fortress near Trstenik
Brangović, fortification near Valjevo
Maglič, fortification near Kraljevo
Mileševac or Hisardžik, fortress near Prijepolje
Kninac or Jerinje, fortress near Peć
Kovin, fortress on the Lim, near Prijepolje
Koznik, fortress ruins near Pljevlja
Severin, fortress near Priboj
Susjed, fortress near Nikšić

Other
Klekov Vrh, peak
Jerenin grad, peak of Mučanj near Ivanjica

See also
Jerina Branković
Smederevo Fortress
Jerina [Irene]'s tower